Kenneth C. Davis is an American history writer, best known for his Don't Know Much About series.

Life
Born in Mount Vernon, New York City, he attended Concordia College, Bronxville in New York, and Fordham University at Lincoln Center, New York though has never graduated from there. He lives in New York City and Dorset, Vermont accompanied by his wife and two children.

Davis's first book, Two-Bit Culture: The Paperbacking of America, offers an overview of the history of paperback books, although some publishers, such as Walter Zacharius and Irwin Stein's Lancer Books, were given little coverage.

Davis has lectured at the Smithsonian Museum and the American Museum of Natural History, and been a contributor to The New York Times, Newsday and other publications.

Don't Know Much About History
Published by Crown in 1990, Davis's second book, Don't Know Much About History, spent 35 consecutive weeks on The New York Times bestseller list and sold nearly 1.5 million copies. This unexpected success launched the Don't Know Much About... series. The standardized format is a chronological coverage of a subject with each chapter divided into boldface subheads of questions, such as, "Did Pocahontas really save John Smith's life?" Davis then answers the questions with basic facts delivered in short easy-to-read essays which have a straightforward approach, but sometimes grab the reader's attention by beginning with light humor and anachronistic comparisons. For example: "Even the astronauts who flew to the moon had a pretty good idea of what to expect; Columbus was sailing, as Star Trek puts it, 'where no man has gone before'." Quotes from historical figures often follow the essays.

The titles were initially inspired by Sam Cooke's song "Wonderful World", with the lyrics, "Don't know much about history" or "geography," etc. The series has generally received favorable reviews. One mixed review criticized Davis for "treat[ing] his subject matter as a vehicle for his own editorials".

America's Hidden History
Davis's book, America's Hidden History: Untold Tales of the First Pilgrims, Fighting Women, and Forgotten Founders Who Shaped a Nation (2008), has a more serious tone than the earlier books, is more expansive, and focuses not only on well-known names but also on forgotten figures such as Hannah Duston.

Books (external links)
  Two-Bit Culture: The Paperbacking of America (Macmillan, 1984)
 Don't Know Much About History (1990) (2003 expanded) )
 Don't Know Much About Geography (1992)
 Don't Know Much About the Bible (1999)
 Don't Know Much About the Civil War (1999)
 Don't Know Much About Space (2001)
 Don't Know Much About the Planet Earth (2001)
 Don't Know Much About the Presidents (2001)
 Don't Know Much About the Kings and Queens of England (2002)
 Don't Know Much About the Universe (2002)
 Don't Know Much About the Pilgrims (2002)
 Don't Know Much About Sitting Bull (2002)
 Don't Know Much About the Pioneers (2003)
 Don't Know Much About American History (2003)
 Don't Know Much About George Washington (2003)
 Don't Know Much About the 50 States (2004)
 Don't Know Much About the Solar System (2004)
 Don't Know Much About Dinosaurs (2004)
 Don't Know Much About Thomas Jefferson (2005)
 Don't Know Much About Abraham Lincoln (2005)
 Don't Know Much About World Myths (2005)
 Don't Know Much About Mummies (2005)
 Que Se Yo De Historia (2005)
 Don't Know Much About Martin Luther King Jr. (2002)
 Don't Know Much About Rosa Parks (2005) 
 Don't Know Much About Mythology (2005) 
 Don't Know Much About Anything (2007) 
 [http://www.worldcat.org/oclc/226065042 America's Hidden History: Untold Tales of the First Pilgrims, Fighting Women, and Forgotten Founders Who Shaped a Nation] (2008) 
 A Nation Rising: Untold Tales of Flawed Founders, Fallen Heroes, and Forgotten Fighters from America's Hidden History (2010) 
 The Hidden History of America at War: Untold Tales from Yorktown to Fallujah (May 2015) 
 In the Shadow of Liberty: The Hidden History of Slavery, Four Presidents, and Five Black Lives (2016) 
 More Deadly Than War: The Hidden History of the Spanish Flu and the First World War (2018)

References

External links
 Don't Know Much official site
 Learning First Alliance interview with Kenneth Davis
 
 In Depth interview with Davis, November 4, 2012

21st-century American historians
American male non-fiction writers
Historians of the United States
Fordham University alumni
Year of birth missing (living people)
Living people
Concordia College (New York) alumni
Writers from Mount Vernon, New York
Historians from New York (state)
21st-century American male writers